Ophichthus celebicus is an eel in the family Ophichthidae (worm/snake eels). It was described by Pieter Bleeker in 1856, originally under the genus Ophisurus. It is a marine, tropical eel which is known from the western Pacific Ocean, including India and Hong Kong.

References

celebicus
Taxa named by Pieter Bleeker
Fish described in 1856